Qualification for surfing at the 2020 Summer Olympics will be based on the performances at two editions of the ISA World Surfing Games, the World Surf League Championship Tour, and the Pan American Games.  Twenty athletes per gender must qualify for the Games, with only a maximum of two each per NOC. Host nation Japan has been entitled to use a single quota place each in both men's and women's shortboard. If Japan directly qualifies in any of the tournaments, the host country place(s) shall be reallocated to the next highest ranked eligible athlete at the 2021 ISA World Surfing Games.

Timeline

Qualification summary
Quota places will be allocated to the athletes in the following events:
 Host country: Japan is allocated 1 place in both men's and women's events.  If at least one Japanese athlete has earned a qualification place through other events, the relevant host country place(s) shall be reallocated to the next highest ranked eligible athlete at the 2021 ISA World Surfing Games.
 2019 World Surf League – the 10 highest ranked men and 8 highest ranked women will be awarded quota places.
 2019 ISA World Surfing Games – the top finishers from each continent with the exception of the Americas will be awarded a quota place.
 2019 Pan American Games – the top finisher in men's and women's events will be awarded a quota place.
 2021 ISA World Surfing Games – the top 4 men and 7 women will be awarded quota places.  If a NOC or National Olympic Committee qualifies more than the maximum number of athletes, the 2021 ISA World Surfing Games will prevail and any places earned from 2019 will be reawarded to the next highest finishing athlete(s). Each NOC is allowed to send a maximum of four athletes (two per gender) to the Olympic surfing competition.

Qualified countries

Events

Men's shortboard

Women's shortboard

References

Qualification for the 2020 Summer Olympics
Qualification
 
Olympics qualification
Olympics qualification